Rashard Lawrence (born August 27, 1998) is an American football nose tackle for the Arizona Cardinals of the National Football League (NFL). He played college football at LSU and was drafted by the Cardinals in the fourth round of the 2020 NFL Draft.

Early years
Lawrence attended Neville High School in Monroe, Louisiana. He was selected to play in the 2016 Under Armour All-America Game, but did not play due to injury. A five-star recruit, he committed to Louisiana State University (LSU) to play college football.

College career
As a true freshman at LSU in 2016, Lawrence played in nine games and had six tackles and one sack. He became a starter his sophomore year in 2017. He started 10 games, recording 32 tackles and 1.5 sacks. As a junior in 2018 he started all 13 games, finishing with 54 tackles and four sacks. He was named the MVP of the 2019 Fiesta Bowl after recording two sacks. Lawrence returned to LSU for his senior year in 2019, rather than enter the 2019 NFL Draft.

Professional career

Lawrence was drafted by the Arizona Cardinals in the fourth round with the 131st overall pick of the 2020 NFL Draft. He was placed on injured reserve on October 17, 2020, with a calf injury. He was activated on December 1, 2020.

Lawrence entered the 2021 season as the Cardinals starting nose tackle. He was placed on injured reserve on November 6, 2021 with a calf injury. He was activated on December 13.

On October 26, 2022, Lawrence was placed on injured reserve after suffering a shoulder injury in Week 7.

References

External links
LSU Tigers bio

1998 births
Living people
Sportspeople from Monroe, Louisiana
Players of American football from Louisiana
American football defensive ends
American football defensive tackles
LSU Tigers football players
Arizona Cardinals players